Kentucky Route 227 (KY 227) is a  state highway in Kentucky that runs from U.S. Route 460 (US 460) near Georgetown, Kentucky to US 42 and KY 36 in Carrollton, Kentucky.

Route description

KY 227 starts north in Scott County and goes through Stamping Ground before entering Owen County. Just southeast of Owenton, KY 227 meets KY 22 and joins it on its way to Owenton. Just before entering downtown Owenton, US 127 joins the route. In downtown Owenton, KY 22 leaves and KY 227 and US 127 travel north alone. Just north of the Owenton city limits, KY 227 leaves US 127 and begins traveling toward New Liberty on a stretch of road that was formerly numbered 978. Just southeast of New Liberty, KY 227 meets KY 36 and joins it through New Liberty before KY 36 branches to the right toward Sanders. KY 227 passes through the unincorporated community of Wheatley before crossing over into Carroll County. KY 227 travels barely west of Worthville. About halfway in Carroll County, KY 227 meets Interstate 71. KY 227 travels for three miles before meeting KY 36 just north of entering the city limits. KY 36 joins KY 227 and both travel north until they meet US 42. KY 227 ends at US 42, while KY 36 leaves and joins US 42 towards the west and into downtown Carrollton.

History

KY 227 was formerly US 227 and ran from Carrollton, Kentucky to Richmond, Kentucky. US 227 was replaced by KY 227, US 460, and KY 627.

In 2011, KY 227 was moved off the US 127 and KY 36 overlaps between Owenton and New Liberty, instead replacing Kentucky Route 978.

Major intersections

References

0227
0227
Transportation in Scott County, Kentucky
Transportation in Carroll County, Kentucky